Njáls saga, also Njála, Brennu-Njáls saga or "The Story of Burnt Njáll", is a thirteenth-century Icelandic saga that describes events between 960 and 1020.
 
The saga deals with a process of blood feuds in the Icelandic Commonwealth, showing how the requirements of honor could lead to minor slights spiralling into destructive and prolonged bloodshed. Insults where a character's manhood is called into question are especially prominent and may reflect an author critical of an overly restrictive ideal of masculinity. Another characteristic of the narrative is the presence of omens and prophetic dreams. It is disputed whether this reflects a fatalistic outlook on the part of the author.

The principal characters in the saga are the friends Njáll Þorgeirsson, a lawyer and a sage, and Gunnar Hámundarson, a formidable warrior. Gunnar's wife, Hallgerðr langbrók, instigates a feud that leads to the death of many characters over several decades including the killing by fire of the eponymous "Burnt Njáll".

The work is anonymous, although there has been extensive speculation on the author's identity. The major events described in the saga are probably historical but the material was shaped by the author, drawing on oral tradition, according to his artistic needs. Njáls saga is the longest and most highly developed of the sagas of Icelanders. It is often considered the peak of the saga tradition.

Authorship and sources

Njáls saga, like the other sagas of Icelanders, is anonymous. There are, however, several hypotheses about the saga's authorship. The oldest idea, attested in the early 17th century, is that Sæmundr fróði wrote the work. Other suggested authors include Sæmundr's sons, Jón Loftsson, Snorri Sturluson, Einarr Gilsson, Brandr Jónsson and Þorvarðr Þórarinsson.

The saga is now believed to have been composed in the period from 1270 to 1290. Among written sources which the author likely used are Laxdæla saga, Eyrbyggja saga and Ljósvetninga saga as well as the lost sagas Brjáns saga and Gauks saga Trandilssonar. however, the author probably derived the bulk of the material in the saga from oral tradition, which he manipulated for his own artistic purposes. Opinions on the historicity of the saga have varied greatly, ranging from pure fiction to nearly verbatim truth to any number of nuanced views. It can be regarded as certain that Njáll and Gunnarr were real historical people and their fateful deaths are referred to in other sources. Gabriel Turville-Petre said, "It was not the author's purpose to write a work of history, but rather to use a historical subject for an epic in prose".

Themes
Njáls saga explores the consequences of vengeance as a defence of family honor by dealing with a blood feud spanning some 50 years. The saga shows how even worthy people can destroy themselves by disputes and demonstrates the tensions in the Icelandic Commonwealth which eventually led to its destruction. Any insult to one's honor had to be revenged: sometimes this includes slights which seem trivial to modern readers. Magnus Magnusson finds it "a little pathetic, now, to read how vulnerable these men were to calls on their honour; it was fatally easy to goad them into action to avenge some suspicion of an insult".

Insults involving a character's manliness are especially prominent in the saga. Thus, Njáll's lack of a beard is repeatedly referred to and used by his opponents to call his manhood into question. Another example, among many, is when the gift of a silk garment is considered an insult by Flosi and a hard-won settlement breaks down as a consequence. Ármann Jakobsson has argued that it is "difficult to find a man whose manhood is not vulnerable" and that Njáls saga criticizes the idea of a misogynistic society by showing that the ideal of masculinity can be so restrictive that it becomes oppressive to men and destructive to society.

Omens, prophetic dreams and supernatural foresight figure prominently in Njáls saga. The role of fate and, especially, of fatalism is, however, a matter of scholarly contention. Halldór Laxness argued that the saga is primarily a book about the fatalism inherent in Norse paganism. In his view, the course of events is foreordained from the moment Hrútr sees the thieves' eyes in his niece and until the vengeance for Njáll's burning is completed to the southeast in Wales. In this way, Laxness believed that Njáls saga attested to the presence of a "very strong heathen spirit", antithetical to Christianity, in 13th century Iceland. Magnus Magnusson wrote that "[t]he action is swept along by a powerful under-current of fate" and that Njáll wages a "fierce struggle to alter its course" but that he is nevertheless "not a fatalist in the heathen sense". Thorsteinn Gylfason rejects the idea that there is any fatalism in Njáls saga, arguing that there is no hostile supernatural plan which its characters are subject to.

Synopsis

Hrútur and Hallgerður

The first episode covers the period from the betrothal of Hrútur Herjólfsson and Unnr to the ugly legacy of their divorce. We are shown Hrútur's exploits in Norway, where he gains honour at court and in battle, but he ruins his subsequent marriage by becoming the lover of the aging queen mother Gunnhildr. When he denies having a woman in Iceland, she curses him so that he is unable to consummate his marriage. After Unnr divorces him, he retains the dowry by challenging Unnr's father, Mörður, to combat. Mörður refuses, as he knows Hrútur's reputation and that he will lose the fight. Because of this, Hrútr keeps the dowry. While this conforms to Icelandic law, it offends justice.

The first chapter gives one of Hrútr's insights when he makes comments about his beautiful niece, "I do not know how thieves' eyes came into the family". The saga next follows this niece, Hallgerður, through her first two marriages.  Both husbands die by the axe of Hallgerður's doting, brutish foster-father, Þjóstólfr. Hallgerður provokes the first death but not the second, although it follows from a disagreement between her and her husband. It is Hrútr who, despite the family ties, avenges the death by killing Þjóstólfr.

Gunnar and Njáll
Gunnar Hámundarson and Njáll Þorgeirsson are now introduced. Gunnar is a man of outstanding physical prowess, and Njáll has outstanding sagacity; they are close friends. When Gunnar is obliged to revive Unnr's dowry-claim against Hrútur, Njáll gives him the means to do so. By skillful play-acting, Gunnar begins the legal process in Hrútur's own house. He follows Hrútr's doubtful example when it comes to court, and Hrútur, who has previously won by threat of violence, loses to a threat of violence. Despite his humiliation, he sees future links with Gunnar.

This comes about when Gunnar returns with honours from a trip to Scandinavia. He goes to the Althing – the annual assembly – in splendour, and meets Hallgerður. They are impressed with one another and are soon betrothed, despite Hrútr's warnings about Hallgerður's character, and Njáll's misgivings.

Hrútur and Njáll are proven right when Hallgerður clashes with Njál's wife, Bergþóra. Hallgerður charms a number of dubious characters into killing members of Njáll's household and the spirited Bergþóra arranges vengeance. After each killing, their husbands make financial settlements according to the status of the victims. The fifth victim is Þórður, foster-father of Njáll's sons. Þráinn Sigfússon, Gunnarr's uncle and Hallgerður's son-in-law, accompanies the killers. When the feud ends and settlements are made, Þráinn's presence at that killing later causes conflict.

Gunnarr's feuds
Hallgerður now uses one of her slaves, Melkólfur, to burgle the home of a churlish man named Otkell. Gunnar immediately seeks to make amends, but his handsome offers are not accepted. A lawsuit is started against him which, with Njáll's help, he wins, gaining great honour. However, while remonstrating with Hallgerður about the burglary, Gunnar slaps her.

This is followed by Otkell accidentally wounding Gunnar. Insult follows injury and Gunnarr reluctantly goes to avenge himself. With belated help from his brother Kolskeggur, he kills Otkell and his companions.

Under Njáll's influence a new settlement is arranged, and Gunnarr's reputation grows. Njáll warns him that this will be the start of his career of killings.

Next, Gunnar accepts a challenge to a horse-fight from a man called Starkaður. In the course of the fight, his opponents cheat, and Gunnar finds himself in a fresh squabble. Njáll tries to mediate but Þorgeir Starkaðsson refuses to accept it. On a journey with his two brothers, Gunnar is ambushed by Starkaður and his allies. In the battle, fourteen attackers and Gunnar's brother Hjörtur are killed.

Worming through all this is Unnr's son, Mörður Valgarðsson. Mörður envies and hates Gunnar, and uses other men to attain his aims. He has learned that Njáll prophesied that Gunnar will die if he kills twice in the same family and subsequently breaks the settlement for his death. He instigates an attack on Gunnar by persons dissatisfied by the settlement. Again, Gunnarr wins the fight, but he kills a second man in the same family. The settlement that follows requires that Gunnarr and Kolskeggur leave Iceland for three years.

Arrangements are made for exile. But as Gunnar leaves home, he looks homeward and, touched by the beauty of his homeland, resolves not to leave Iceland, thus becoming an outlaw. He goes about as though nothing has changed but his enemies, Mörður among them, seek revenge. He defends himself in his home until his bowstring is cut. Hallgerður refuses to give him strands of her hair to restring his bow; this is in revenge for the slap he once gave her. Gunnar's enemies resist Mörður's proposal to burn him in the house as shameful, but eventually they take the roof off to get to Gunnar. Njáll's son Skarphéðinn assists Högni Gunnarsson in some acts of vengeance before a settlement is achieved.

Kári and the sons of Njáll
Scandinavian rulers honor two Icelandic expeditions: those of Þráinn Sigfússon and of Njáll's two younger sons. Both return with enhanced honor, but also with companions. Þráinn brings back the malevolent Hrappr; the sons of Njáll and the noble Kári Sölmundarson, who marries their sister. But Njáll's sons also bring back a grievance, blaming Þráinn for the way in which the de facto ruler of Norway, Jarl Hákon, has treated them while looking for Hrappr, who had been hidden by Þráinn. While Njáll says they have been foolish in raising the matter, he advises them to publicise it so that it will be seen as a matter of honor. Þrain refuses a settlement, and his retainers, including Hallgerðr, on her last appearance, insult them.

The most dramatic of the saga's battles follows. Njáll's sons, with Kári, prepare to ambush Þráinn and his followers. There is a bridge of ice over the river between them. Skarphéðinn overtakes his brothers, leaps the river, and slides on the ice past Þráinn, splitting his skull in passing. Between them the attackers kill four men, including Hrappr.

Þráinn's brother, Ketill, has married Njáll's daughter, and between them they bring about a settlement. Wishing to stop further contention, Njáll adopts Þráinn's son Höskuldr as his foster-son. Höskuldr grows up in Njáll's household, and is loved and favoured by him. When he is fully grown, Njáll attempts to find a suitable wife for him, Hildigunnr. However, she refuses, saying that she will only marry Höskuldr if he becomes a chieftain. Njáll manages to get Höskuldr a chieftaincy by instituting the Fifth Court at the Althing, and Höskuldr and Hildigunnr are married.

At this point, the saga recounts the conversion of Iceland to Christianity in 999 CE.

Höskuldr and Flosi, the burning
Mörðr Valgarðsson now finds Höskuldr to be such a successful chief that his own chieftaincy is declining. He sets the sons of Njáll against Höskuldr; the tragedy of the saga is that they are so susceptible to his promptings that they, with Mörðr and Kári, murder him as he sows in his field. As one character says, "Höskuldr was killed for less than no reason; all men mourn his death; but none more than Njal, his foster-father".

Flosi, the uncle of Höskuldr's wife, takes revenge against the killers, and seeks help from powerful chieftains. He is pressured (against his better judgement) by Hildigunnr to accept only blood vengeance. Njáll's sons find themselves at the Althing having to plead for help. Skarphéðinn has become grimly fatalistic, and insults many who might help them.

After some legal sparring, arbitrators are chosen, including Snorri goði, who proposes a weregild of three times the normal compensation for Höskuldr. This is so much that it can only be paid if the arbitrators, and many at the Althing, contribute. The great collection is gathered, and Njáll adds a gift of a fancy cloak. Flosi claims to be insulted by the offer of a unisex garment (an insult from Skarp-Heðinn also adds fuel to the fire) and the settlement breaks down.

Everyone leaves the Althing and prepares, amid portents and prophecies, for the showdown. A hundred men descend on Njáll's home, Bergthorsknoll (Bergþórshváll), to find it defended by about thirty. Any victory for Flosi will be at some cost. But Njáll suggests that his sons defend from within the house, and they, while realizing that this is futile, agree. Flosi and his men set fire to the building.

Both the innocent and the guilty are surrounded. Flosi allows the women to leave but beheads Helgi Njálsson, who attempts to escape disguised as a woman. Although Flosi invites Njáll and Bergþóra to leave, they refuse, preferring to die with their sons and their grandson Þórðr (the son of Kári). Eventually eleven people die, not including Kári who escapes under cover of the smoke by running along the beam of the house. Flosi knows that Kári will exact vengeance for the burning.

The Althing
At the Althing, both sides gather. Flosi bribes Eyjólfr Bölverksson, one of the finest lawyers in Iceland, into taking over the case, while his opponents blackmail Mörðr Valgarðsson into prosecuting, advised by Þórhallr, Njáll's foster-son, who was trained in the law by Njáll, but is kept away from the proceedings by an infected leg. There is a legal joust between the parties. Eventually, when his legal action seems to be failing, Þórhallr lances his boil with his spear and begins fighting. Flosi's men are driven back until Snorri separates the parties. In the confusion, several are killed including Ljótr, Flosi's brother-in-law.

Ljótr's father, Hallr of Síða, takes advantage of the truce to appeal for peace, and seeks no compensation for his son. Moved by this, all but Kári and Njáll's nephew Þorgeir reach a settlement, while everyone contributes to Ljótr's weregild, which in the end amounts to a quadruple compensation. The burners are exiled.

Before the sons of Sigfús reach home, Kári attacks them, and most of the rest of the saga describes his vengeance for the burning. He is supported by Þorgeir and an attractive anti-hero named Björn. He pursues them to Orkney and Wales. The most dramatic moment is when he breaks into the earl's hall in Orkney and kills a man who is giving a slanderous account of those killed at the burning.

After a pilgrimage to Rome, Flosi returns to Iceland. Kári follows, and is shipwrecked near Flosi's home. Testing Flosi's nobility he goes to him for help, and they arrange a final peace. Kári marries Höskuldr's widow. Finally, there is a full reconciliation.

Popular culture
In numerous Shanghai magazines, the Chinese composer Nie Er went by the English name George Njal, after a character in the saga.
 Þórunn Erlu-Valdimarsdóttir, Kalt er annars blóð (Reykjavík: JPV, 2007) retells the saga as a crime novel.
 The 2014 Icelandic novel Mörður by Bjarni Harðarson retells Njáls saga from Mörðr Valgarðsson's point of view.
 An Icelandic short film called Brennu-Njálssaga (known by its English title in Europe as The Saga of Burnt Njal) was directed by Friðrik Þór Friðriksson and released 1981. The film is featured on the Icelandic DVD release of Angels of the Universe. Featured in the soundtrack is a song called "Brennu-Njálssaga," composed by the Icelandic new wave band, Þeyr with the collaboration of Hilmar Örn Hilmarsson. This song later appeared in 1981 when the group released its single Iður til Fóta (in the cassette version only).
 Episode 27 of Monty Python's Flying Circus is titled "Njorl's Saga". The "saga" in question is quite unrelated to any events in Njal's Saga, despite the similarities between the names.
 The 1964 book The Burning of Njal by Henry Treece re-tells the saga from the recovery of Hrútr's dowry to Kári's final reconciliation with Flosi.
 The Red Romance Book, a collection of heroic tales and legends published in 1905 and lavishly illustrated by Henry Justice Ford, includes three stories based on the saga: The Slaying of Hallgerda's Husbands, The Death of Gunnar, and Njal's Burning.
 The Hallgerda Mons, a mountain on Venus, is named for Hallgerðr.
 In DreamWorks' animated series Dragons: Race to the Edge season 3 episode 3 a small excerpt from Njáls saga is chiseled into a sword and a wall in a cave using the Futhorc runic alphabet.
 The 1995 adventure film The Viking Sagas is inspired heavily by the saga, through features an original plot.
 Tim Severin's Viking-Trilogy (2005) uses large parts of the saga.
 The trope of a man trapped in a building and burned to death drives the Icelandic TV series Trapped (Ófærð).
 BBC Radio 3 broadcast The Saga of Burnt Njal, an audio adaptation by Hattie Naylor based on a translation by Benjamin Danielsson and directed by Gemma Jenkins, on 24 October 2021, with Justin Salinger as "Njal", Christine Kavanagh as "Bergthora", Justice Ritchie as "Gunnar", Lisa Hammond as "Hattgerd", Jasmine Hyde as "Mord" and Salomé Gunnarsdottir as "The Voice of the Saga".

Manuscripts and editions

Njáls saga survives in around 60 manuscripts and fragments, 21 of which – an unusually large number – are from the Middle Ages. None of the vellum manuscripts survives complete, but they tended to be copied conservatively, indicating the reverence which Icelandic scribes have had for the saga and making it relatively easy to reconstruct a complete medieval text. The vellum manuscripts were classified most recently by Einar Ólafur Sveinsson in 1953, en route to his 1954 Íslenzk fornrit edition of the saga, which remains the standard edition. However, a project on 'The Variance of Njáls saga ', based in the Árni Magnússon Institute for Icelandic Studies, is reassessing the complete history of the manuscript transmission of the saga.

The first printed edition of the saga, by Ólafur Ólafsson, based primarily on Reykjabók, with reference to Kálfalækjabók and Möðruvallabók, was published in Copenhagen in 1772. A major step in the editing of the saga was the 1875–89 critical edition of Konráð Gíslason and Eiríkur Jónsson. The current main edition is that of Einar Ólafur Sveinsson from 1954.

The known, surviving manuscripts of the saga, most of which are available in digital facsimile, are:

Translations

Njáls saga has been translated into English four times:

 
 Repr. 1900, London: Grant Richards.
 Repr. 1911: London, New York: Dent, Dutton.
 
 Repr. 1956, London: George Allen and Unwin.
 Repr. 1979, Westport, Conn.: Greenwood Press.  
 Repr. 1998, Ware, Herts.: Wordsworth Editions.  
 
 Translation by Robert Cook, in 
 Rev. repr. as Njal's Saga, 2001, London: Penguin.

Further reading
 Jakobsson, Ármann. 2007. "Masculinity and Politics in Njáls saga", Viator 38, pp. 191–215.
 Sveinsson, Einar Ól. 2010 [1954]. Brennu-Njáls saga. Hið íslenzka fornritafélag. .
 Laxness, Halldór. 1997 [1945]. "Eftirmáli", Brennunjáls saga. Vaka-Helgafell. .
 Magnusson, Magnus. 1987 [1960]. "Introduction", Njal's Saga. Penguin Classics. .
 Gylfason, Thorsteinn. 1998. "Introduction", Njál's Saga. Wordsworth Classics. .
 Ólason, Vésteinn. 1998. Dialogues with the Viking Age: Narration and Representation in the Sagas of the Icelanders. Heimskringla. .
 Ólason, Vésteinn. 2006. "Íslendingasögur og þættir", Íslensk bókmenntasaga I. .
 Swalm, Brendan. Sowing Strokes and Reaping Blows: Scenic Proverbialization and Paroemial Cognitive Patterning in “Brennu-Njáls saga”. M.A. Thesis, University of Saskatchewan, 2015.

External links

Modernized Icelandic text with translations into many languages at the Icelandic Saga Database
An online public domain edition of Njal's Saga: George Dasent's English translation.  Icelandic Saga Database
Modernized Icelandic text
The official Njal's Saga website—The Njála museum in Hvolsvöllur, Iceland

www.njalurefill.is Njals Tapestry
 
 Annotated bibliography and text at Wikisaga.

References

13th-century books
Sagas of Icelanders
Sources of Norse mythology